Paradichelia is a genus of moths belonging to the family Tortricidae.

Species
Paradichelia basipuncta (Diakonoff, 1941)
Paradichelia brongersmai Diakonoff, 1952
Paradichelia clarinota Diakonoff, 1953
Paradichelia coenographa (Meyrick, 1938)
Paradichelia euryptycha Diakonoff, 1952
Paradichelia fulvitacta Diakonoff, 1953
Paradichelia ocellata Diakonoff, 1953
Paradichelia rostrata Diakonoff, 1952

See also
List of Tortricidae genera

References

 , 1952, Proc. Konin. Neder. Akad. Weten. (C) 55: 384.
 , 2005, World Catalogue of Insects 5.

External links
tortricidae.com

Archipini
Tortricidae genera